Gerry Burke is an Irish former hurler who played as a right wing-forward for the Offaly senior team.

Born in Banagher, County Offaly, Burke first played competitive hurling in his youth. He made his senior debut with Offaly during the 1967-68 National League and immediately became a regular member of the team.

At club level Burke is a one-time Leinster medallist with St Rynagh's. He also won numerous championship medals with the club.

Honours
St Rynagh's
Leinster Senior Club Hurling Championship (1): 1970

References

Living people
St Rynagh's hurlers
Offaly inter-county hurlers
Year of birth missing (living people)